James Olatokunbo Akingbola (born 7 April 1978) is an English television, theatre and film actor.

Early life
Jimmy Akingbola was born in London to parents of the Yoruba tribe who had emigrated from Nigeria. 

In 1996, Akingbola started at the Academy of Live and Recorded Arts (ALRA) in Wandsworth, London. He completed their three-year, full-time acting diploma.

Theatre
Akingbola started his career on stage at the Birmingham Repertory Theatre in The Nativity for Bill Alexander.  He continued in a production of Baby Doll at the Royal National Theatre. Next he appeared in "Naked Justice" by playwright John Mortimer at the West Yorkshire Playhouse, opposite Leslie Phillips.

Akingbola played Elvis in the poignant play Behzti at the Birmingham Rep in December 2004.  He worked with rapper and actor Riz Ahmed in the hit play Prayer Room. Akingbola earned four-star reviews for his performance as Bunce.

Akingbola acted in the production of Roxanne Silbert's play People Next Door, in which he gave a memorable performance alongside actor Fraser Ayres’ character as his best friend Marco.

Akingbola won his first award (TMA Theatre Award for Best Supporting Actor) for the role of Christopher in Blue/Orange, first produced at the Sheffield Crucible Theatre; the production then went on a national tour. He played opposite Roger Lloyd-Pack and Shaun Evans in Joe Penhall's award-winning play, which was directed by Kathy Burke.

Akingbola later went on to star in The Cut at the Donmar Warehouse opposite Ian McKellen, directed by Michael Grandage. Additional roles include Akingbola playing anti-hero Jimmy Porter in the John Osborne play of Look Back in Anger at the Jermyn Street Theatre in July 2008; he was the first black actor to play the role. The same year he played the title role of Othello for the company Frantic Assembly, which received a TMA Award.

Television
Akingbola's television roles started with the black BBC sitcom "The Crouches" playing the witty character of Dennis Dutton.  He has since played roles in Stupid, The Bill, The Royal, The South Bank Show, Roger Roger, Holby City, Doctors, New Tricks, Comedy Lab, and Longford. Akingbola secured his first permanent major television role appearing in BBC's police drama series HolbyBlue, starring alongside Kacey Ainsworth and Tim Pigott-Smith, as PC Neil Parker alongside his on screen colleague PC Kelly Cooper, played by Chloe Howman. In 2009, he played Dean Collier in New Tricks ("Blood Is Thicker Than Water", S6:E7).  Akingbola returned to show his comedy talent in 2010, starring in the BBC2 hit series Rev. where he played the popular character "Mick", alongside Tom Hollander and Olivia Colman. For his role as Mick, Akingbola was nominated for "Best TV Comedy Performance" at the Black International Film Festival and Music Video & Screen Awards. Akingbola also played the roles of Malick in Holby City and PC Johnson in Silk, both on BBC One in 2011.

In 2014, Akingbola played blind geography teacher Dr Dalton in episode 2 of the second series of BBC One sitcom Big School.

In 2015, Akingbola plays Baron Reiter in Arrow season 4.

In March 2020, Akingbola played Koji, an asylum seeker, in the first series of the ITV sitcom Kate & Koji but wasn't available for the filming of series two so Okorie Chukwu took on the role.  In the same year, he played Carter in Most Dangerous Game for Quibi. He will next reprise his role of Valentine in series 3 of In the Long Run with Idris Elba and will follow that with Ted Lasso for Apple TV+.

Filmography

Film

Television

Stage

Audio/Radio
Akingbola is the voice in several popular computer games for electronics game brands including EA, Disney, PlayStation and Funcom.  Games titles include; Dead Space 2, Pirates of the Caribbean, Gangs of London, Age of Conan, The Secret World, Dirt 2, James Bond: Golden Eye, Brink and Dirty Bomb.

Akingbola works with BBC Radio as a regular voice over contributor to several shows including BBC World Service, BBC Radio 4 and 7.

Awards and nominations

Nominations
 Best Male TV Actor, Screen Nation (BBC's "Holby Blue")

References

External links

1978 births
21st-century English male actors
Alumni of the Academy of Live and Recorded Arts
Black British male actors
English adoptees
English male film actors
English male soap opera actors
English male stage actors
English people of Nigerian descent
English people of Yoruba descent
Living people
People from Plaistow, Newham
Yoruba male actors